Montevarchi is a town and comune in the province of Arezzo, Tuscany, Italy.

History
The town of Montevarchi sprang up around 1100, near to a fortified Benedictine monastery,  founded by bishop Elempert (986–1010) of Arezzo.  At first the castle belonged to the Marquis Bourbon del Monte di Santa Maria, then to the Count Guidi family.  In 1273 ownership passed to the Signoria of Florence. One of the town's first podestà (mayor) was Brunetto Latini.

During the rule of the Medici, the town expanded considerably due to its flourishing agricultural trade and its wool and silk industries, controlled by the Woolmaker's Guild. Montevarchi remained under Florentine control until the end of the first half of the 18th century; then the town became part of the territory of Arezzo.

After the unification of Italy, it became an important centre for manufacture of felt hats and, during the  post World War II  period, of shoes, hats, ladies' and children's wear.  Today it is still a clothes production hub, while also important in the production of electricity  (one hydroelectric and one thermoelectric plant).

Geography
The comune is bordered by Bucine, Cavriglia, Gaiole in Chianti, Pergine Valdarno, San Giovanni Valdarno and Terranuova Bracciolini.

Main sights

Churches
 Collegiata di San Lorenzo. The foundation of the Collegiate Church of San Lorenzo dates back to the 13th century. This so-called "collegiate church" was erected in 1561 by Pope Pius IV and the Grand Duke Cosimo de' Medici appointed Benedetto Varchi as the first magistrate of this church. Originally built in Romanesque style, the church was totally refurbished by Massimiliano Soldani Benzi in 1709 which gave it a decisive, but delicate, Baroque touch. San Lorenzo's main treasure is the Relic of the Holy Milk which, according to tradition, was given to Count Guido Guerra, Lord of Montevarchi, by Charles I of Naples on 26 February 1266 after the victorious Battle of Benevento, when Guido Guerra successfully led a Guelph formation of heavy cavalry against an onslaught.
 Church of Santa Maria al Giglio. The construction was begun in 1589 after a series of miracles attributed to the fresco that now is above the main altar. These so-called miracles were, in fact, part of an elaborate hoax organized by the Fraternita del Sacro Latte, a powerful local religious brotherhood, in order to increase the value of their properties in the area.
 Chiostro di Cennano. The Cloister of Cennano was formerly part of the Franciscan convent of San Ludovico suppressed in 1808. Typically Tuscan, it has the date 1471 carved in one of the capitals. The door of the cloister is dated 1522.
 The Holy Milk Relic Chapel or Della Robbia Temple was reconstructed in 1973 in the Museum of Collegiata to house the recovered original 15th-century ceramic sculptures by Andrea della Robbia, removed from the church in 1709 and walled up for two centuries in the sacristy.

Museums
 Accademia Valdarnese del Poggio Library. The Library of the Academy, founded in 1805, contains 20,000 volumes, various incunabula and manuscripts including a valuable 15th century copy of The Decameron.

 Museo Paleontologico.  The Paleontology Museum is housed in the ex-Franciscan convent of San Ludovico. The museum hosts about 1,600 fossils with samples of flora and fauna. Nearly all the fossils come from the Upper Valdarno area and date back to a period of time between upper Pliocene and lower Pleistocene. The poster for the exhibition is the original one made in 1819 by Georges Cuvier.
 Museo d'Arte Sacra. The Museum of Sacred Arts of the Collegiate Church of San Lorenzo houses sculptures, frescoes, crafted gold objects, ornaments, relics and manuscripts. Of particular interest are the liturgical objects commissioned by the local Holy Milk Brotherhood and notably the ceramic sculpture by Andrea della Robbia.
 Museo Ernesto Galeffi. This museum is dedicated to the artist for whom it is named who died in 1986 and hosts a huge collection of Galeffi's works donated to the community, housed in a villa donated by the Galeffi-Benini family. Ernesto Galeffi started as a graphic designer, then moved to painting and finally turned to sculpture. The museum, opened in 2001, holds 60 sculptures, 10 paintings and more than 2,000 drawings.

Shopping
 SPACE. Is Prada's outlet store that is adjacent to the Prada factory.  Many tourists visit this store on a daily basis to take advantage of discounted prices.

International relations

Sister cities
Montevarchi is twinned with:
 Kitzingen, Germany, since 1984
 Roanne, France, since 1988
 Bethlehem, Palestine, since 1993
 Bir Lehlou, Western Sahara, since 1998

Cooperation
 Kanougou, Burkina Faso, since 1991
 Slawharad, Belarus, since 2002
 Rahat, Israel, since 2005
 Lehavim, Israel, since 2008

Notable people
 Francesco Failli, road racing cyclist, was born in Montevarchi.
 Francesco Mochi, sculptor, was born in Montevarchi.
 Luca Canonici, opera singer, was born in Montevarchi.

References

Sources
 Leone Ugo Masini (1960). Montevarchi attraverso i secoli. Florence: Bemporad Marzocco. .  
 Grazia Gobbi (1986). Montevarchi, profilo di storia urbana. Florence: Alinea. . 
 Anna Maria Massinelli (1998). Montevarchi. Translated by Graham Sells. Florence: Franco Cantini Editore. . .

External links 
 
 

Cities and towns in Tuscany